Hot Mess is the fifth extended play by English singer-songwriter Dodie Clark, known mononymously as dodie. The album was released by Clark's record label Doddleoddle on 30 September 2022.

Track listing
All songs written by Dodie Clark, except "Got Weird", written by Clark and Peter Miles.

Personnel
Dodie – lead vocals, background vocals, mixing engineer
Peter Miles – background vocals, mixing engineer, mastering engineer
Greta Isaac – background vocals

References

2022 EPs
Dodie (singer) albums
Self-released EPs
Pop music EPs